Neuroctenus is a genus of flat bugs in the Aradidae subfamily Mezirinae. There are about 7 described species in Neuroctenus.

Species
 Neuroctenus arizonicus Kormilev, 1982
 Neuroctenus elongatus Osborn, 1903
 Neuroctenus hopkinsi Heidemann, 1904
 Neuroctenus pseudonymus Bergroth, 1898
 Neuroctenus punctulatus (Burmeister, 1835)
 Neuroctenus simplex (Uhler, 1876)
 Neuroctenus unistellatus Vásárhelyi, 1994

References

 Thomas J. Henry, Richard C. Froeschner. (1988). Catalog of the Heteroptera, True Bugs of Canada and the Continental United States. Brill Academic Publishers.

Further reading

 

Aradidae
Pentatomomorpha genera